Runnymede is a water-meadow alongside the River Thames in the English county of Surrey, and just over  west of central London. It is notable for its association with the sealing of Magna Carta, and as a consequence is, with its adjoining hillside, the site of memorials. Runnymede Borough is named after the area, Runnymede being at its northernmost point.

Topography 

The name Runnymede refers to land in public and National Trust ownership in the Thames flood plain south-west of the river between Old Windsor and Egham. The area includes (to the west of A308 road) the Long Mede and Runnymede, which together with Coopers Hill Slopes is managed by the National Trust. There is also a narrower strip of land, east of the road and west of the river, known as the Yard Mede. On the west bank of the river, at the southern end of the area shown on the above map, are (inter alia): a recreational area with a large car park; a number of private homes; a large distribution centre; and a hotel.

The landscape of Runnymede is characterised as "Thames Basin Lowland", urban fringe. It is a gently undulating vale of small fields interspersed by woods, shaws, ponds, meadows, and heath. The National Trust area is a Site of Nature Conservation Interest (SNCI) which contains a Site of Special Scientific Interest. Both sites are overseen by Runnymede Borough Council.

The National Trust holding includes:

  donated in 1929 set behind a narrow riverside park with occasional benches on the southern river bank, with car and coach parking;
  of broadleaved woodland on Coopers Hill Slopes, given in 1963 by the former Egham Urban District Council.

Long Mede is a meadow north of the ancient "mede" (meadow) of Runnymede towards Old Windsor and has been used for centuries to provide good-quality hay from the alluvial pasture. Runnymede itself lies towards Egham. It is likely that Runnymede proper was the site of the sealing of Magna Carta, although the Magna Carta Memorial (see below) stands on Long Mede.

The sealing of Magna Carta is also popularly associated with Magna Carta Island, on the opposite (east) bank of the Thames. It has also sometimes been associated with the nearby Ankerwycke Yew. These and their surrounding landscape of floodplain and parkland may once have formed an integral part of Runnymede, as the river has occasionally changed its course here. Ankerwycke and the ruins of the 12th-century Priory of St Mary's were both acquired by the National Trust in 1998. As the Thames forms the county boundary at this point, these areas now lie in Berkshire.

History 
Runnymede's historical significance has been heavily influenced by its proximity to the Roman Road river crossing at nearby Staines-upon-Thames.

The name Runnymede may be derived from the Anglo-Saxon runieg (regular meeting) and mede (mead or meadow), describing a place in the meadows used to hold regular meetings. The Witan, Witenagemot or Council of the Anglo-Saxon Kings of the 7th to 11th centuries was held from time to time at Runnymede during the reign of Alfred the Great. The Council met usually in the open air. This political organ was transformed in succeeding years, influencing the creation of England's 13th century parliament.

The water-meadow at Runnymede is the most likely location at which, in 1215, King John sealed Magna Carta. The charter indicates Runnymede by name as "Ronimed. inter Windlesoram et Stanes" (between Windsor and Staines). Magna Carta affected common and constitutional law as well as political representation also affecting the development of parliament.

Runnymede's association with ideals of democracy, limitation of power, equality and freedom under law has attracted placement there of monuments and commemorative symbols.

The last fatal duel in England took place in 1852, on Priest Hill, a continuation of Cooper's Hill by Windsor Great Park.

The National Trust land was donated in 1929 by Cara Rogers Broughton and her two sons. The American-born widow of Urban Hanlon Broughton, she was permitted by letter from George V to join her son's new peerage in tribute to her husband and this gift and be officially styled Lady Fairhaven. The gift was given in memory of Urban Broughton. At the time the New Bedford Standard-Times commented "It must be a source of gratification to all Americans, and especially to us here and in Fairhaven, that the presentation of this historic spot as public ground has been brought about by an American woman, an appropriate enough circumstance considering that the great charter underlies the USA's conception of government and human rights."

Runnymede Eco Village
Between 2012 and 2015, Cooper's Hill was occupied by a radical community living in self-build houses, huts, benders and tents, in the self-proclaimed "Runnymede Eco Village". Around 40 people, including a few young families, lived in a dispersed settlement throughout the 4 acres of woodland. They used mainly reclaimed material to build living structures, solar power to generate electricity, wood burners for heat, cultivated some vegetables and kept chickens and geese. Water was obtained from springs on the site, and the village was largely hidden from view from outside the woodland. The members called themselves "Diggers" after the 17th-century movement of that name.

There were two unsuccessful attempts to evict the settlers in the first year of occupation; and on 30 March 2015 a further High Court trespass notice was served by bailiffs on behalf of the landowners, Orchard Runnymede Ltd. The settlers were still in occupation during the Magna Carta 800th anniversary celebrations on 15 June, but their presence did not affect proceedings, and the eviction was completed at a later date.

Features

Urban H. Broughton memorials 

After the death of Urban Broughton in 1929, Sir Edwin Lutyens was commissioned to design a set of twin memorials consisting of large kiosks and posts or "piers" with stone blocks crowned with laurel wreaths and formalised urns at the Egham end and with lodges and piers at the Windsor end. Lutyens also designed a low wide arch bridge to carry the main road over the Thames to the north, integrating the road layout and bridge design into his plans for the memorials. The southern kiosks were moved to their present location when the M25 motorway was constructed.

There are two octagonal kiosks with piers facing each other across the A308 towards Egham. These piers are a shorter version of those adjacent to the lodges either side of the same road towards Old Windsor in the Long Mede. The lodges show typical Lutyens design features with steeply angled roofs, large false chimneys and no rainwater gutters at the eaves.

The piers carry similar inscriptions. On one face is the inscription:

and on the other the words:-

The memorials were opened in 1932 by the Prince of Wales (Edward VIII) and are Grade II listed buildings.

Langham Pond SSSI 

Langham Pond was created when the meandering River Thames formed an oxbow lake. Its status as a wetland Site of Special Scientific Interest (SSSI) was first notified in 1975 and later reviewed under Section 28 of the Wildlife and Countryside Act 1981 when the protected area was extended to  within Runnymede as managed by the National Trust.

The pond and associated meadow form a habitat considered unique in Southern England and of international importance for nature conservation. The flora and fauna include nationally scarce plants and insects including a species of fly unrecorded elsewhere in the United Kingdom.

Air Forces Memorial 

The Air Forces Memorial commemorates the men and women of the Allied Air Forces who died during the Second World War and records the names of the 20,456 airmen who have no known grave.

From the top of the tower visitors can see long views over Windsor, the surrounding counties and aircraft taking off and landing at Heathrow. On a good day visitors can see as far as the Wembley Arch and even the Gherkin in the City of London. The memorial was designed by Sir Edward Maufe, architect of Guildford Cathedral.

John F. Kennedy Memorial 

The British memorial for U.S. President John F. Kennedy was jointly dedicated on 14 May 1965, by Queen Elizabeth II and Jacqueline Kennedy, prior to a reception for the Kennedy family at Windsor Castle. The memorial consists of a garden and Portland stone memorial tablet inscribed with the famous quote from his Inaugural Address:

Visitors reach the memorial by treading a steep path of irregular granite steps, intended to symbolise a pilgrimage. There are 50 steps in total. Each step is different from all others, with the entire flight made from 60,000 hand-cut granite setts. Landscape architect Geoffrey Jellicoe designed the garden; sculptor Alan Collins designed and carved the stone inscription.
The area of ground on which the memorial is situated was given as a gift to the United States of America by the people of the United Kingdom, though the area remains under the sovereignty of the United Kingdom. It is maintained by the Kennedy Memorial Trust, which also sponsors educational scholarships for British students to attend university in the United States.

In 1968 the 7-ton stone was damaged by a bomb during a time of anti-Vietnam war demonstrations; it was later repaired by the sculptor.

Magna Carta Memorial 

Situated in a grassed enclosure, on the lower slopes of Cooper's Hill, this memorial is of a domed classical style monopteros, containing a pillar of English granite on which is inscribed "To commemorate Magna Carta, symbol of Freedom Under Law". The memorial was created by the American Bar Association (ABA) after a suggestion by the lawyer and historian Louis Ottenberg. Designed by Sir Edward Maufe R.A., it was unveiled on 18 July 1957 at a ceremony attended by American and English lawyers.

Since 1957 representatives of the ABA have visited and rededicated the Memorial, renewing pledges to the Great Charter. In 1971 and 1985 commemorative stones were placed on the Memorial plinth.
In July 2000 the ABA came:

In 2007, on its 50th anniversary, the ABA again visited Runnymede. During its convention it installed as President Charles Rhyne, who devised Law Day, which in the USA represents an annual reaffirmation of faith in the forces of law for peace. Floodlights were installed in 2008 to light the memorial at night.

In 2015, in anticipation of the 800th anniversary of the sealing of Magna Carta, the two wooden benches at the memorial were replaced by stone benches. On 15 June, the anniversary day, the ABA, accompanied by US Attorney General Loretta Lynch, rededicated the memorial in a ceremony led by The Princess Royal in the presence of the Queen and other members of the Royal family.

The Magna Carta Memorial is administered by the Magna Carta Trust, which is chaired by the Master of the Rolls.

Ceremonial tree plantings 

The Duke of Kent together with David K. Diebold, a Minister-Counselor at the US Embassy in London, planted an oak tree adjacent to the Magna Carta Memorial in 1987, as did P. V. Narismha Rao, Prime Minister of the Republic of India.{{ The Prime Minister left a plaque reading:

In 1987 two further oak trees were planted near the Memorial. One, planted by Queen Elizabeth II, marked National Tree Week. Another, planted by John O. Marsh, Secretary of the Army of the US, has a plaque which reads:

The Jurors 

The Jurors artwork was commissioned by Surrey County Council and the National Trust to mark the 800th anniversary of the sealing of Magna Carta. The sculptor Hew Locke created 12 bronze chairs each of which is decorated with symbols of past and present struggles for freedom, equality and the rule of law. The artist / sculptor invites participants to sit, reflect upon and discuss the themes represented. In the image the back of the chair nearest the viewer is a representation of Nelson Mandela's prison cell on Robben Island, South Africa. The portrait seen of the further chair is of Lillie Lenton wearing insignia related to the imprisonment and activism of suffragettes.

The installation was inaugurated at Runnymede by Prince William during the Magna Carta 800th Anniversary celebrations.

Writ in Water

Based on Clause 39 of Magna Carta, and inspired perhaps by the inscription on John Keats' grave monument, artist Mark Wallinger designed "Writ in Water" to celebrate the legacy of Magna Carta. It combines sky, light and water creating a space for reflection both physically and contemplatively. Architects Studio Octopi installed the art work on Coopers Hill Slopes (accessible from Longmede) and it was unveiled on the 803rd anniversary of the sealing of the Great Charter.

Cooper's Hill House 

A large house on Cooper's Hill, overlooking Runnymede and the River Thames, has been at different times: the Royal Indian Engineering College; wartime Post Office headquarters; storage during World War II for the statue of Anteros (popularly known as "Eros") from the Shaftesbury Memorial Fountain, Picadilly Circus, London; an emergency teacher training college; the Shoreditch College of Education (a centre for craft and handiwork education); and most recently, Brunel University's department of design (since relocated to Brunel University's campus in Uxbridge).

Ankerwycke Yew 

The revered 1,400 year old-plus Ankerwycke Yew, on the left (east) bank of the river, is also a possible site where Magna Carta may have been sealed. The tree could have been the location of the Witan council and influenced the founding of St Mary's Priory there. This religious site may well have been the preferred neutral meeting place of King John and the barons.

Land development proposals threatening the yew led to action resulting in the tree and surrounding estate passing into the protection of the National Trust in 1998.

Henry VIII is said to have met Anne Boleyn under the tree in the 1530s.

In 1992, botanist and environmental campaigner David Bellamy led a dedication at the yew, stating:

There followed ten pledges to sustain all life forms.

Location and access 

The areas held by the National Trust are open 24 hours and seven days a week at no charge. However, parking times on the medes are restricted and additionally carry a charge for non-National Trust visitors.

Two car parks (on the A308) adjoin the Windsor entrance (these may be closed in winter due to flooding etc.). The car parks near the Old Windsor entrance are managed by the National Trust: they are free for members, but there is a charge for non-members. The car park at the Runnymede Pleasure Ground further along the A308 at the Egham entrance to the medes is managed by Runnymede Borough Council which imposes a sliding scale of charges. Runnymede lies on the Thames Path National Trail. The nearest railway station is Egham. One of the Lutyens lodges at the Windsor entrance to the meadow houses a popular tea room.

The Anckerwycke area on the other bank of the river is accessible from the B376 between Wraysbury and Staines (nearest station Wraysbury).

Namesakes

Spain 
 Madrid, Spain: Runnymede College

Australia 

 Runnymede, Queensland, (postcode 4615) – a rural locality near Nanango and Kingaroy.
 Runnymede, Victoria, (postcode 3559) – a rural locality north east of Bendigo.
 Runnymede, Tasmania, (postcode 7190) – a village north of Richmond.
Runnymede Group Pty Ltd (Company, Sydney Australia)

Canada 
London, Ontario, Runnymede Crescent
 Toronto, Ontario: Runnymede Road; Runnymede subway station, Runnymede Collegiate Institute
 Victoria, British Columbia: Runnymede Avenue, Runnymede Place
St. John's, Newfoundland Labrador: Runnymede Place

France 
 Joinville-le-Pont, Val de Marne, Île de France, France : place de Runnymede

India 
 Udhagamandalam, Tamil Nadu: Runnymede (NMR) Station

United States 
 Runnymede, Harper County, Kansas
 Runnemede, New Jersey
 Runnymede Plantation, Charleston County, South Carolina
 Lake Runnemede, Windsor, Vermont

Notes

References

External links 

 
 Runnymede information at the National Trust
 Shoreditch College, Information about the former teachers' college at Cooper's Hill House

History of England
National Trust properties in Surrey
River Thames
Water-meadows
Grasslands of the United Kingdom
Works of Edwin Lutyens in England
Magna Carta
Meadows in Surrey